Richard Harrington (born 12 March 1975) is a Welsh actor.

Early and personal life
Harrington was born in Gurnos and brought up in Heolgerrig, Merthyr Tydfil. Harrington speaks Welsh as a second language; he came from an English-speaking family but studied in a Welsh Medium school in Merthyr. He has said that filming Y Gwyll improved his fluency significantly.

Harrington has two children with a former girlfriend and a son, born in 2019, with his partner Hannah Daniel, with whom he lives in Crystal Palace, London.

Harrington took part in the 2012 and 2013 Snowdonia Marathon alongside his friend and fellow actor Mark Lewis Jones. They both ran Marathon des Sables in 2014.

Career
Harrington has had starring roles in the Welsh show Hinterland (known as Y Gwyll in Welsh), Bleak House, Jimmy McGovern's Gunpowder, Treason & Plot, and Gavin Claxton's comedy feature film The All Together. He has also had roles in Coronation Street, Spooks, Casualty, Holby City, Hustle, Dalziel and Pascoe, Silent Witness, Lark Rise to Candleford, and Poldark. He won a BAFTA Cymru Award for his portrayal of a young gay hustler in the BBC film Dafydd, part of the Wales Playhouse programme.

On stage, Harrington has toured with Fiction Factory/Y Cwmni's productions of Ed Thomas's plays House of America, Gas Station Angel and Stone City Blue. He also appeared in the 1997 film version of House of America.

In 2015, Harrington won another BAFTA Cymru Award for his role as DCI Tom Matthias in Y Gwyll / Hinterland.

In April 2017, Harrington presented the BBC Two Wales programme Richard Harrington: My Grandfather's War, in which he followed the journey his grandfather had made through Spain in 1937 in order to fight against fascism in the Spanish Civil War.

In 2018 he appeared at the National Theatre in London in Home I'm Darling,  a co-production with Theatr Clwyd.

In February 2021, speaking of the first year of the COVID-19 pandemic, Harrington revealed that he had worked as a Deliveroo driver to supplement his income during lockdown, due to the lack of work.

Filmography

Theatre
 House of America – Fiction Factory
 Gas Station Angel – Royal Court
 Stone City Blue – Theatre Clwyd
 Art and Guff – Soho Theatre
 Other Hands – Soho Theatre
 Look Back in Anger – Theatre Royal, Bath
 Coriolanus – NTW
 Home I'm Darling – National Theatre

External links
 BBC Bleak House profile
 Richard Harrington at the British Film Institute

References 

Living people
Welsh male television actors
People from Merthyr Tydfil
People educated at Ysgol Gyfun Garth Olwg
Welsh-speaking actors
1975 births